The 1982–83 UCLA Bruins men's basketball team represented the University of California, Los Angeles in the 1982–83 NCAA Division I men's basketball season.  Larry Farmer was in his second year as the head coach, and the Bruins started the season ranked 7th in the nation (AP Poll). On December 28, the Bruins hosted #13 Louisville, winning 76-72. UCLA beat the #18 (AP Poll) Washington Huskies 84-65, on February 2. UCLA's team won the Pac-10 regular season and finished 7th AP and UPI polls.

Starting lineup

Roster

Schedule

|-
!colspan=9 style=|Regular Season

|-
!colspan=12 style="background:#;"| NCAA Tournament

References

UCLA Bruins men's basketball seasons
Ucla
Ucla
NCAA
NCAA